LST 1564:2000 is a character encoding used to write the Lithuanian language. It is a modification of ISO/IEC 8859-13 to support the accented Lithuanian letters.

Codepage layout
The following table shows LST 1564. Each character is shown with its equivalent Unicode code point. Only the second half of the table (code points 128–255) is shown, the first half (code points 0–127) being the same as ASCII.

References

Character sets
Lithuanian language